Pierre Gauthier (born May 28, 1953) is a former General Manager of the Montreal Canadiens, Mighty Ducks of Anaheim, and Ottawa Senators. He is currently the director of player personnel of the Chicago Blackhawks.

Hockey career
Gauthier started out in the NHL working for the Quebec Nordiques in various scouting roles from 1981 to 1993.

He has also served Canada in international hockey, managing the 1996 and 1997 world championship teams and assisting in the 1998 Canadian Olympic squad.

Mighty Ducks of Anaheim and Ottawa Senators
From 1993 to 1995, he was the Assistant general manager for the Mighty Ducks of Anaheim. He left this position in 1995 to become the third general manager of the Ottawa Senators, signing a five-year contract. His time with Ottawa coincided with a turnaround in the team's fortunes.  After the 1997–98 season he left his contract early, citing family issues, saying he would take time off to explore life away from hockey. Seventeen days later he was re-hired by the Ducks where he served as president and general manager.
He was fired in 2002 after Anaheim missed the playoffs for three consecutive seasons.

Montreal Canadiens
On July 21, 2003, Gauthier joined the Montreal Canadiens as Director of Professional Scouting. On July 24, 2006, he was named Assistant to the General Manager while keeping the responsibilities attached to professional scouting. On February 8, 2010, he was named vice president and general manager of the Montreal Canadiens.

Gauthier had a very controversial year as the Canadiens general manager in 2011–12. Gauthier fired the team coach Jacques Martin mid-season with the team slumping. Martin's replacement, Randy Cunneyworth, was chosen by Gauthier as the interim coach. Cunneyworth did not speak French, and this decision was heavily scrutinized by the Montreal media. There was outrage and protest among some Canadiens fans.

Gauthier also incited the wrath of fans by trading 2010 playoff hero Michael Cammalleri to the Calgary Flames during a game against the Boston Bruins. Cammalleri had been critical of the organization in the days leading up to the trade,  and the move was perceived by many to be a response to those comments. When he learned of the trade, Cammalleri asked if he could keep the jersey from his final game as a souvenir. Gauthier told him he could have it for the price of $1,250.

On March 29, 2012, the Montreal Canadiens announced Gauthier had been relieved of his duties as general manager of the team.  He then joined the Chicago Blackhawks, as Director of Player Personnel and had his name engraved on the Stanley Cup in 2013 and later in 2015. So as to right Gauthier's wrong, the new management gifted Cammalleri with the jersey from his final game as a souvenir.

References

1953 births
Anaheim Ducks executives
Chicago Blackhawks executives
Ice hockey people from Quebec
Living people
Montreal Canadiens executives
National Hockey League general managers
Ottawa Senators general managers
People from Montreal
Quebec Nordiques personnel